Sunita Singh (born 22 February 1974) is an Indian former cricketer who played as a right-arm medium bowler. She appeared in two Test matches and 18 One Day Internationals for India between 2000 and 2002 She played domestic cricket for Air India and Railways.

References

External links
 
 

1974 births
Living people
Cricketers from Amritsar
Indian women cricketers
India women Test cricketers
India women One Day International cricketers
Air India women cricketers
Railways women cricketers